Djilali Mehri is the chairman and CEO of Pepsi Algeria, the holding Maghreb and the Middle East Investors, and he has a project to build 36 hotels with the Accor in major cities in Algeria such as Algiers, Constantine and Oran.

Biography

Born on December 15, 1937 in El Oued, Algeria, Djilali Mehri initially started with his first project Daouia Farm, founded by Djilali Mehri, who was successful in international commerce before turning to agriculture, sets the pace for local innovation. Neither a farmer nor the son of a farmer, Mehri simply believed that his homeland could produce anything, and he foresaw the possibilities offered by the then-new technologies of hybrid seedlings and drip irrigation. Beginning in 1985 with 54 hectares (133 acres), and now farming a dense expanse of 700 hectares (1730 ac), Daouia produces pears, pomegranates and pistachios, all marketed nationwide and gradually entering the European market. He planted date palms, eucalyptus for its value in water management, and, in 1990, he introduced olive-growing to El-Oued, his most promising innovation.

-in the mid 1990s he built his new factory Pepsi Cola, Algeria .
-in 1997 he became an independent MP in the Algerian parliament
-in 2005 he start a big project with Accor to build 36 hotels across Algeria.

References

External links
DJILALI MEHRI BUILDS 36 HOTELS
STAND UP AND BE COUNTED

Algerian chief executives
Algerian businesspeople
Living people
1937 births
Members of the People's National Assembly
People from El Oued
21st-century Algerian people